Gbomblora is a village in Burkina Faso. It is the capital of Gbomblora Department.

History 
In February 2022, Gbomblora was scene of a deadly explosion at a gold mine.

Demographics 
In 2006, the population was 169.

References 

Poni Province
Villages in Burkina Faso